Komiz may refer to:
 Komiz, Hormozgan
 Komiz, Markazi